The canton of Marvejols is an administrative division of the Lozère department, southern France. Its borders were modified at the French canton reorganisation which came into effect in March 2015. Its seat is in Marvejols.

Composition

It consists of the following communes:
Antrenas
Lachamp-Ribennes
Marvejols
Recoules-de-Fumas
Saint-Léger-de-Peyre

Councillors

Pictures of the canton

References

Cantons of Lozère